"Robin (The Hooded Man)" is the first single released by Irish group Clannad from their 1984 album Legend. This song was the theme tune to the ITV drama Robin of Sherwood and heralded Clannad's effectiveness in soundtrack.

A promotional video was filmed and released for the song, showing Clannad playing in the studio intercut with scenes from the TV series.

Track listing
7" vinyl
 "Robin (The Hooded Man)"
 "Lady Marian"

Songs about fictional male characters
Clannad songs
1984 singles
Songs written by Ciarán Brennan
1984 songs
Television drama theme songs